Middle-earth: The Wizards Companion is a book published by Iron Crown Enterprises (ICE) in 1996 about their Middle-earth Collectible Card Game.

Description
Middle-earth: The Wizards Companion is a 104-page softcover book written by Coleman Charlton, Michael Reynolds, John Curtis, Pete Fenlon, Jason O. Hawkins, Nick Morawitz, Jessica Ney-Grimm, and Dave Platnick. The book acts as a guide to the Middle-earth Collectible Card Game, which had been published by ICE the previous year. It features an introduction discussing the background and inspiration for the game, followed by a revised and annotated set of rules for the game. It also details turn summaries, strategy tips and various ways the game can be played solo.

Reception
In the June 1996 edition of Arcane (Issue 7), Andy Butcher was ambivalent about Middle-earth: The Wizards Companion, commenting, "What is here is good stuff - but it could have been a lot better." Butcher gave this book an average rating of 7 out of 10 overall. 

In the August 1996 edition of Dragon (Issue 232), Rick Swan called the book a "lavish guide" to the game, and noted that it had everything except color illustrations of the game cards. He concluded with a strong recommendation for players of the Middle-earth Collectible Card Game, saying, "The site analysis alone, however, makes it an essential purchase for those more interested in mastering the rules than drooling over artwork."

Reviews
Backstab #3

References

Books about collectible card games